Pillot may refer to:

People
 Cooper Pillot, American actor
 Jean-Jacques Pillot (1808–1877), French revolutionary 
 Luc Pillot (born 1959), French Olympic sailor 
 Rémi Pillot (born 1990), French footballer

Other
 Henke & Pillot, American supermarket chain
 Hubbard Bell Grossman Pillot Memorial, public artwork Washington, D.C., U.S.A.
 Pillot Building, building in Houston, Texas, U.S.A.